This timeline is a supplement of the main article Uyghur. Dealing with the centuries between 400 and 900 AD, it refers to a critical period in the cultural formation of the Uyghur nation, as they transitioned from a minor Turkic tribe to the Uyghur Khaganate.

Events leading to the formation of the Uyghur Khaganate

References 
.

Uyghurs
Turkic timelines